William Oxney may refer to:

William Oxney (died 1413), MP for Great Yarmouth (UK Parliament constituency), 
William Oxney (fl.1417), MP for Great Yarmouth (UK Parliament constituency), son of the earlier MP